Homeward Bound: The Incredible Journey  is a 1993 American adventure comedy film and a remake of the 1963 film The Incredible Journey, which was based on the 1961 novel of the same name by Sheila Burnford. Directed by Duwayne Dunham, it was released on February 3, 1993. It grossed $57 million worldwide and was followed in 1996 by Homeward Bound II: Lost in San Francisco. This film is dedicated to producer Franklin R. Levy, who died during production of the film.

Plot

Chance, a selfish and free-spirited American Bulldog and the narrator of the film, explains that he is the pet of Jamie Burnford, but expresses no interest in his owner or being part of a family. He shares his home with Shadow, a wise old Golden Retriever owned by Jamie's brother Peter, and Sassy, a pampered Himalayan cat owned by Peter and Jamie's sister Hope. That morning, the children's mother, Laura Burnford, marries Bob Seaver, and Chance causes trouble by devouring the wedding cake in front of all the guests.

Shortly after the wedding, the family has to temporarily move to San Francisco because Bob must relocate there for his job. They leave the pets at a ranch belonging to Kate, Laura's college friend. Shadow and Sassy miss their owners immediately, but Chance sees it as an opportunity to relax and be free. Later in the week, Kate goes on a cattle drive, leaving the animals to be looked after by her neighbor Frank. However, half of her message to him is lost, leading him to believe that she has taken them along, leaving the animals alone. Unsure about the disappearance of their host, the animals fear they have been abandoned. Shadow, refusing to believe that his boy would leave him, decides to make his way home. Not wanting to be left alone on the ranch, Chance and Sassy decide to accompany Shadow on his journey.

They head into the rocky, mountainous wilderness of the Sierra Nevada with Shadow leading. After a night spent in fear of the woodland noises, the group stops to catch breakfast at a river. However, two black bear cubs interrupt Chance and a large brown bear causes the group to retreat. At another river, Sassy refuses to swim across to follow the dogs and instead tries to cross via a wooden path further downstream; halfway across, the wood breaks and she falls into the river. Shadow tries to save her, but she goes over a waterfall to her apparent death. Guilt-ridden, Shadow and Chance go on without her. Unknown to them, Sassy survives and is later found on the riverbank by an old man named Quentin, who nurses her back to health.

Over the next two days, Shadow and Chance try unsuccessfully to catch food and encounter a mountain lion, which chases them to the edge of a cliff. Shadow gets an idea to use rocks positioned like a seesaw as a way to outsmart the mountain lion. While Shadow acts as bait, Chance pounces onto the end of the rock and sends the mountain lion over the cliff and into a river. Sassy hears the dogs barking in celebration and follows the sound to rejoin them.

The animals continue on their way, but Chance begins pestering a porcupine, ending up with a load of quills in his muzzle. The animals then encounter a little girl named Molly, who is lost in the woods. Loyalty instinct takes over and they stand guard over her during the night. In the morning, Shadow finds a rescue party and leads them back to the girl. They recognize the animals from a missing pets flyer and take them to the local animal shelter, but Chance mistakes it for an animal pound and the trio panic. As the medical staff remove the quills from Chance's muzzle, Sassy sneaks in and frees Shadow. Together, they retrieve Chance and escape the shelter, unaware that their owners are on their way to get them.

Finally reaching their hometown, the animals cross through a train yard, where Shadow falls into a muddy pit and injures his leg. Despondent, he tells Chance and Sassy to go on without him, and when Chance argues passionately, tells the younger dog he's learned all he needs; "Now all you have to learn is how to say goodbye." Heartbroken, Chance insists he won't let him give up. Near dusk, Chance and Sassy finally make it home and are happily reunited with their owners. Shadow initially fails to appear, but eventually he limps into view and happily comes running home at the sight of Peter. Chance narrates how it was Shadow's belief that brought them home and how the years seemed to lift off of him, making him a puppy again as he reunited with his boy. The film ends with Chance musing about how he truly feels "home" with his family, before happily running into the house at the smell of food.

Cast
Michael J. Fox as the voice of Chance
Don Ameche as the voice of Shadow
Sally Field as the voice of Sassy
Robert Hays as Bob Seaver
Kim Greist as Laura Burnford-Seaver
Benj Thall as Peter Burnford-Seaver
Veronica Lauren as Hope Burnford-Seaver
Kevin Chevalia as Jamie Burnford-Seaver
William Edward Phipps as Quentin
Ed Bernard as Desk Sergeant
Gary Taylor as Frank
Jean Smart as Kate
Bart the Bear as Bear
David MacIntyre as Foote
Mark L. Taylor as Kirkwood
Caroll Spinney as Dog in Pound

Reception
The film received positive reception. The film holds an 87% aggregate critic approval rating at Rotten Tomatoes based on 30 reviews, with the consensus stating "Disney's remake of The Incredible Journey successfully replicates, and in some ways improves upon, the simple charms of the original, with its cross-country animal odyssey sure to delight kids." According to movie critic Roger Ebert, the movie is "frankly designed for kids, and yet it has a certain craftsmanship and an undeniable charm, and if you find yourself watching it with a child you may end up liking it almost as much." Audiences polled by CinemaScore gave the film an average grade of "A+" on an A+ to F scale.

The film grossed $41,833,324 in the United States and Canada and $15.5 million internationally for a worldwide total of $57.4 million.

References

External links
 
 
 
 

1993 films
1990s adventure films
Remakes of American films
1990s English-language films
Films about cats
Films about dogs
Films based on British novels
Films based on children's books
Films directed by Duwayne Dunham
Films set in California
Films set in San Francisco
Films shot in Oregon
Films shot in Portland, Oregon
Films with screenplays by Caroline Thompson
Films with screenplays by Linda Woolverton
Walt Disney Pictures films
Films scored by Bruce Broughton
1993 directorial debut films
Films with screenplays by Jonathan Roberts (writer)
Films about cougars